Penny Downie is an Australian actress known for her stage and television appearances in the United Kingdom.

Career 
Downie began her career in Australia, initially in Brisbane at Twelfth Night Theatre and Brisbane Arts Theatre. Downie was a student of theatre director, Joan Whalley. She trained at the National Institute of Dramatic Art (NIDA), Sydney.

TV and film
After graduation she appeared in Australian TV series such as The Box, Bellbird, The Sullivans, Prisoner, and Learned Friends.

She moved to the United Kingdom in the early 1980s. In 1984 she appeared as Dee Rogers in the Minder episode "If Money Be the Food of Love, Play On". Her many UK TV credits include: Inspector Morse, Kavanagh QC, The Inspector Lynley Mysteries, Spooks,  and New Tricks. She also appeared in The Girl in the Cafe.

In 2009, she played Mrs. Pienaar in the Clint Eastwood film Invictus.

In 2013, she appeared as Rev Mother Augustine in the Father Brown episode "The Bride of Christ".  In 2014, Downie starred in an episode of Suspects as Fiona Sullivan, and appeared as Lady Sinderby, mother of Atticus Aldridge, in series five of Downton Abbey.

Stage 
She is an associate artist of the Royal Shakespeare Company. where she has played roles such as Lady Anne in Richard III in the 1984 production featuring Antony Sher in the lead, and Hermione and Perdita in The Winter's Tale. She appeared in the premiere of Nick Dear's play The Art of Success in Stratford in 1986 and later at the Barbican Theatre, London, alongside Michael Kitchen and Simon Russell Beale.

In 2008, she played opposite David Tennant and Patrick Stewart as Gertrude, in the Royal Shakespeare Company's production of Hamlet which was subsequently adapted for BBC television and aired in late 2009. Downie played the title character in Euripides' Helen at Shakespeare's Globe Theatre in 2009.

Downie played the title role in A Storm in a Flower Vase, a play based on the life of Constance Spry, which held its West End debut at the Arts Theatre.

Filmography

FILM

TELEVISION

References

External links
 

Australian film actresses
Australian soap opera actresses
Australian stage actresses
British film actresses
British soap opera actresses
British stage actresses
British television actresses
Living people
Royal Shakespeare Company members
Actresses from Brisbane
National Institute of Dramatic Art alumni
20th-century Australian actresses
20th-century British actresses
21st-century Australian actresses
21st-century British actresses
People educated at Brisbane State High School
Year of birth missing (living people)